Kristoffer Nilsen (23 May 1901 – 6 September 1975) was a Norwegian boxer who competed in the 1924 Summer Olympics. He was born and died in Oslo, and represented Kristiania AK. In 1924 he was eliminated in the first round of the lightweight class after losing his fight to Richard Beland.

References

1901 births
1975 deaths
Sportspeople from Oslo
Lightweight boxers
Olympic boxers of Norway
Boxers at the 1924 Summer Olympics
Norwegian male boxers
20th-century Norwegian people